Victor Herbert Melodies, Vol. 1 is a studio album featuring five 78 rpm phonograph records recorded by artists Bing Crosby, Frances Langford, Florence George and Rudy Vallee celebrating the music of Victor Herbert. The recordings were made in December 1938 by Decca Records, who were probably aware that a film called The Great Victor Herbert was being made by Paramount Pictures. Victor Young and His Orchestra provided the musical accompaniment to all of the tracks. The album was followed by a sequel Victor Herbert Melodies, Vol. 2

Track listing
These newly issued songs were featured on a 5-disc, 78 rpm album set, Decca Album No. A-38.

Disc 1: (2315)

Disc 2: (2316)

Disc 3: (2317)

Disc 4: (2318)

Disc 5: (2319)

References

1939 albums
Decca Records albums
Bing Crosby albums
Rudy Vallée albums
Frances Langford albums